Pieńki may refer to the following places:
Pieńki, Łódź Voivodeship (central Poland)
Pieńki, Augustów County in Podlaskie Voivodeship (north-east Poland)
Pieńki, Białystok County in Podlaskie Voivodeship (north-east Poland)
Pieńki, Łuków County in Lublin Voivodeship (east Poland)
Pieńki, Włodawa County in Lublin Voivodeship (east Poland)
Pieńki, Radom County in Masovian Voivodeship (east-central Poland)
Pieńki, Gmina Domanice in Masovian Voivodeship (east-central Poland)
Pieńki, Gmina Kotuń in Masovian Voivodeship (east-central Poland)
Pieńki, Gmina Mokobody in Masovian Voivodeship (east-central Poland)
Pieńki, Gmina Mordy in Masovian Voivodeship (east-central Poland)
Pieńki, Wołomin County in Masovian Voivodeship (east-central Poland)
Pieńki, Greater Poland Voivodeship (west-central Poland)
Pieńki, Opole Voivodeship (south-west Poland)
Pieńki, Warmian-Masurian Voivodeship (north Poland)